Gardi may refer to:

People 
Gardi Hutter, Swiss clown, born 1953
Ibrahim Khan Gardi, Muslim general from India, died 1761
Gardi, Surname founded mostly in afghanistan 
Gardi, a sub-caste of the Kalbelia community of Rajasthan
Sumer Singh Gardi, an assassin of Narayanrao, died 1775

Places 
Gardi, India
Gardi, Nepal